Lui Villaruz is a Filipino actor and television host.

Filmography

Television

Film

Awards and nominations

References

External links
 

Living people
Filipino male television actors
Star Magic
Filipino male film actors
Travel broadcasters
Filipino television presenters
Year of birth missing (living people)